Carpenul River may refer to:

 Carpen, a tributary of the Cașin in Harghita County
 Carpenul, a tributary of the Teleajen in Prahova County

See also 
 Cărpiniș (disambiguation)